Christopher "Chris" Miles is a fictional character in the British teen drama Skins, portrayed by Joe Dempsie.

Characterisation
Chris's character was initially portrayed as being very into pills and as being something of a hedonist, but at the same time had other layers to his personality. According to the official Skins website, he will "smoke/screw/rob/snort anything". He is very keen on going to his psychology lessons as he has feelings for his teacher, Angie, who is described as being "out of this world" in Chris's eyes. He later enters a relationship and falls in love with Jal. Jal gets pregnant late in the second series but does not keep the baby. He is also shown as having possessed a great admiration of his late older brother and feels like he cannot compare to him. In his profile on E4's website, he says that he enjoys listening 1970s emo music and the pop of the 1980s, and that he doesn't like TV at all; he considers it as "[...]a box with images in...". Chris died in Season 2 Episode 9, of a brain haemorrhage like his brother. The gang celebrates their A-Level results and go to Chris's funeral in the last episode.

Character history

Series 1
In "Tony", Chris is convinced by Maxxie Oliver to go to a "big gay night out" along with Anwar Kharral, but being bored, they eventually go to Abigail Stock's party instead, where he and a Polish girl have wild sex. His flirtatious relationship with his Welsh psychology teacher, Angie, is also made apparent. In "Cassie", he accidentally sees Angie naked in the teachers' showers, and later apologises.

The episode "Chris" develops his character the most. He wakes up one morning having taken viagra which he did not need the night before, and comes downstairs to find his mum has run away and given him £1,000 to live off. After spending the money on a huge party, and embarrassing himself with his erection in front of Angie, who came to the party, he finds himself homeless after he is kicked out by a squatter who is living in his stripped-down house, the contents of which he has had to sell.

Chris is homeless and naked. He walks to school naked and goes to Angie for help and advice. His friends arrive and give him clothes, which Cassie Ainsworth and Maxxie charmed from boys in Unseen Skins''' accompanying episode "A Friend in Need". Jal Fazer takes him to see his dad, who doesn't want anything to do with him or his mother, who is implied to be mentally unstable. Chris accidentally drops his baby half-brother, and runs as fast as he can to the graveyard, where he tells Jal the best day of his life when he was in the scouts, when his older brother Peter helped him when Chris was humiliated. Once he finishes telling Jal his story, he stands up, revealing that the gravestone he was sitting at is in fact his older brother's. In the episode's conclusion, he is put up in a dorm room by a sympathetic Angie.

Eventually, in "Maxxie and Anwar", Chris and Angie admit their feelings for each other. After fellow teacher, Tom, talks badly to Angie - whom he could not seduce – Chris tries to cheer her up, and they end up kissing, which leads to sex. They are caught by Maxxie, who is visibly shocked and hurriedly closes the door.

Chris and Angie's relationship progresses throughout the series, until the series finale, when the return of Angie's fiancé, Merve, destroys their relationship, Chris realising he may lose Angie for good. He concludes that Merve is "obviously gay", after watching a videotape of Angie's that shows Merve as a campy weatherman on Australian television. Eventually, Chris takes Angie's engagement ring, and is confronted by Merve and two of his friends, and told to give it back. Chris denies he has it, and it is only when Angie eventually bursts in, and asks Chris to return it, that he complies. However, when he gives the ring back, Chris drops it, probably accidentally, and kneels down to pick it up, causing Anwar's uncle to think that Chris is proposing. Angie takes the ring, and runs off, leaving both Chris and Merve opposite one another. After she runs away, Chris comes to the conclusion that she loves him, and thus earns a punch from Merve, starting a minor brawl. In the closing montage, he and Angie are seen staring at each other with sad expressions through a window. In Chris's lost-week webisode, he is seen recording a message to Angie.

Series 2
In the first episode of the second season, Chris is seen with Maxxie and Jal trying to comfort and look after Tony Stonem, following his accident. That night, they go to a party which they have tried to keep Tony from finding out about.

In the next episode, we learn that Angie has decided not to return to teach her class. She leaves a private message to Chris in code, but does not say goodbye to him explicitly. Chris is upset and confused about this, as he had been looking forward to Angie coming back, partly so that they could see each other again. After this, he goes on the camping trip for Michelle Richardson's birthday, and is attracted to her stepsister, Scarlett, and spends the weekend complimenting her and looking at her breasts.

In episode five of the second season, we see Jal and Chris make a deal, that Chris will give his life a go and stop saying 'fuck it' and Jal will stop saying no to everything. After a number of unsuccessful jobs, Chris gets a job as a sales person and squats in one of the houses he is supposed to be selling, where Cassie moves in temporarily. Inevitably, he and Jal end up getting together, and Chris' life begins to straighten up. Chris is performing exceptionally at work, and with support and affection from Jal, he is genuinely happy for a change. However, things lead to chaos when Cassie decides to have a house-warming party there and Angie turns up. The two have sex in the bathroom, however, Chris abruptly stops when he thinks of Jal. Chris opens the bathroom door to leave and finds Jal outside, and she realises what has happened between him and Angie. Chris then attempts to get Jal back and invites her to the flat that Angie left him before leaving. They get back together, however he doesn't yet know that Jal is pregnant, with his baby.

In episode eight, Jal returns from her audition to find Chris has been taken to hospital because he has suffered a subarachnoid haemorrhage, a result of the hereditary condition that his brother died of previously. Jal tells a comatose Chris that she is pregnant and gives him her lucky coin to take into an operation.

In the series' penultimate episode, Chris's mother reappears but can't bear to visit him because his brother died from the same condition he has. Cassie overhears him crying because Jal wants an abortion and decides not to tell him about his mother. She tries to cheer Chris up and gives him a T-shirt with "Monkey Man" written on it. He tells her that he cannot wait to show it to someone. Chris then starts to feel funny and realizes that he cannot remember Jal's name. He runs out of the room and falls onto his bed. Cassie runs after him and then runs to find her phone. Cassie calls an ambulance then runs back to Chris. Chris has had a second subarachnoid hemorrhage and is now bleeding from his nose. He tells Cassie that he remembers Jal's name and then goes still. After witnessing Chris die in her arms, Cassie flees to New York in a state of severe shock.

After Chris' father forbids Chris' friends from attending his funeral (because in his opinion, they are the reason he had changed), Tony and Sid Jenkins decide to steal his body to hold their own funeral. However, Jal is distressed at this idea and she and Michelle persuade them to return the coffin to the hearse. Chris' friends decide to watch the funeral from afar, whilst Jal makes the following speech comparing Chris to one of his heroes, Captain Joe Kittinger, and referencing Kittinger's Project Excelsior:

“I've been thinking about what Chris would have wanted me to say today. The advice he'd give me, which'd be something like, 'Know what, babe? Fuck it. These guys know all about me. Tell them about someone different.' So I thought I'd tell you about a hero of Chris's: a man called Captain Joe Kittinger. In 1960, climbing into a foil balloon, Captain Joe ascended 32 kilometers into the stratosphere. And then, armed only with a parachute, he jumped out. He fell for four minutes and thirty-six seconds, reaching seven hundred and forty miles per hour before opening his parachute five kilometers above the Earth. It had never been done before, and it's never been done since. He did it just because he could. And that's why Chris loved him - because the thing about Chris was, he said yes. He said yes to everything. He loved everyone. And he was the bravest boy - man - I knew. And that was - he flung himself out of a foil balloon every day. Because he could. Because he was. And that's why - and that's why,.......we, we loved him.”

After Jal had finished her speech (which Chris' father listened to over the funeral proceedings), the friends set off several bright pink fireworks, to say goodbye in their own way.

Series 3
Cook is now staying in Chris's old dorm room, shown by the graffiti which read 'Chris loves fish' with a picture of a fish, which is clearly visible in JJ's central episode. Also Cook dons a red and white striped shirt formerly worn by Chris, albeit dirtier and more worn. The scene in Cook's first central episode where he drinks a cup of water and swallows the fish inside is also a reference to when Chris swallowed a pill down with fish water in his episode in series 1.

References

External links
 Chris Miles on the official E4 Skins'' site
 Chris Miles on Myspace

Skins (British TV series) characters
Fictional English people
Fictional businesspeople
Television characters introduced in 2007
Fictional cannabis users
Fictional drug addicts
Male characters in television
Teenage characters in television
British male characters in television